Simferopol is a medium reconnaissance ship of the Ukrainian Navy that was originally built at the Kuznya na Rybalskomu (previously Leninska Kuznya) shipbuilding plant. The new reconnaissance ship is based on the Project 502EM named Laguna.

Development and design 

Deputy Commander of the Naval Forces of Ukraine announced the future construction of a new ship for the Ukrainian Navy during his interview for one of the Odessa TV channels in March 2017. Kuznya on Rybalsky was specified as the lead manufacturer.

Ukrainian shipbuilder PSC Kuznya on Rybalsky launched a new medium reconnaissance ship for the Ukrainian Navy on 23 April 2019.

On 20 October 2019 an unfinished middle-sized reconnaissance ship of the Laguna project was launched in Kherson, after which it made a crossing of the Dnipro river to Odessa for completion and commissioning.

According to Dumskaya sources in the Ministry of Defense, it was named "Simferopol" - in honor of the capital of the occupied Autonomous Republic of Crimea. Transmitted by the National Industrial Portal. The decision to give the new reconnaissance ship such a name expresses the connection between generations of ships of this class in the Ukrainian Navy, serves to support and symbolize Crimea's affiliation with Ukraine, and is a sign of support for the captain of the Simferopol project 861, who is oppressed by Crimean occupation authorities.

In particular, various antennas will be installed during the works, namely the Melchior radio intelligence station and other systems.

See also 
 Slavutych (Ukrainian command ship)

References

Ships of the Ukrainian Navy
2019 ships